a song by SDHS Family (meaning "pas là pour plaire")
Peter Lougheed Provincial Park, a park in Alberta
plasma lipoprotein particle, HDL and LDL cholesterol
Pusat Latihan & Pembangunan Pengembangan